Jerchel may refer to the following places in Saxony-Anhalt, Germany:

Jerchel, Gardelegen
Jerchel, Stendal